The Attorney General of Namibia is the chief legal adviser of the President and government of Namibia. They are responsible for upholding and protecting the Namibian constitution. Unlike many other attorneys general, the Namibian Attorney General holds no prosecutorial power, which is instead the responsibility of the Prosecutor General of Namibia.

History

List of attorneys general

Attorneys general of South West Africa 
 Lucas Cornelius Steyn (1931-1933)
 J. P. Niehaus (1939-1941) acting (United Party)

Attorneys general of Namibia

See also 

 Ministry of Justice (Namibia)
 Politics of Namibia

References 

Attorneys-General of Namibia
1990 establishments in Namibia
Government of Namibia